Matthew Arnold School is a coeducational secondary school and sixth form located just west of Oxford near Cumnor Hill and Botley and is named after 19th-century poet Matthew Arnold.

The school contains around 1,300 pupils from years 7 to 13, and circa 80 teaching staff. The school catchment area includes Oxford to the west of the railway station, Botley, Cumnor, Binsey, Wytham, and stretches west towards Appleton, Fyfield and Kingston Bagpuize.

Previously a community school founded in 1958 as Matthew Arnold Secondary Modern, it was administered by Oxfordshire County Council. In August 2015 Matthew Arnold School converted to academy status and is now part of the Acer Trust.  The school continues to coordinate with Oxfordshire County Council for admissions.

References

External links
Matthew Arnold School official website
Teacher, 27, dies playing rugby

Secondary schools in Oxfordshire
Academies in Oxfordshire
Educational institutions established in 1958
Schools in Oxford
1958 establishments in England